Orrick may refer to:

People
Andrew Downey Orrick (1917–2008), attorney
William Horsley Orrick Jr. (1915–2003), federal judge
William Orrick III (1953–), federal judge

Other
Orrick, Missouri
Orrick, Herrington & Sutcliffe, a U.S. law firm

See also 
 Oreck
 Orick (disambiguation)